José Carlos Schwarz (Bissau, December 6, 1949 – Havana, May 27, 1977) was a Bissau-Guinean poet and musician.

Biography
José Carlos Schwarz was born in Bissau (Portuguese Guinea) from well-to-do parents of Cape Verdean, Portuguese Guinean and German descent. After his high school education in Senegal and Cape Verde and a short stay in Lisbon, he returned to Guinea-Bissau in 1969. In 1970 he formed the Cobiana Djazz band with a group of friends (Aliu Bari, Mamadu Bá and Samakê). The band was a considerable local success, partly because the band started to play more and more gumbe, an original West African music style. Schwarz wrote in Portuguese and French, but he sang in Creole.

He also became politically active, and joined the resistance against the colonial ruler. He was imprisoned in the prison of the Ilha das Galinhas (Guinea-Bissau) for his participation in the struggle for the independence of his country. Inspired by this experience, he composed the song "Djiu Di Galinha".

Following the independence of Guinea-Bissau in 1974, Schwarz became director of the Department for Art and Culture, also responsible for Guinea-Bissau's youth policy. In 1977 he got a job at the Guinea-Bissau embassy in Cuba. On May 27 of the same year, Schwarz died in a plane crash near Havana.

Discography

Songs

 Ke ki mininu na tchora (Why is that child crying?)  "Unknown hunters shelled the village";"Black fighters, black just like us", a reference to the conflicts between Bissau-Guineans who fought with the colonial army and the freedom fighters.
 Mindjeris di panu pretu (Women in black clothes), a tribute to the war widows.
 Djiu di Galinha - Ilha das Galinhas - the Chicken Island, the island where Schwarz was imprisoned

References

1949 births
1977 deaths
People from Bissau
Bissau-Guinean musicians
Bissau-Guinean poets
Victims of aviation accidents or incidents in Cuba
20th-century poets
Bissau-Guinean male writers
Male poets
20th-century male writers
Bissau-Guinean people of German descent
Bissau-Guinean people of Cape Verdean descent